Está de Moda (In Style) is the fourth studio album by Puerto Rican merengue band Grupo Manía released on December 10, 1996. It topped the Billboard Tropical Albums. The album contains the lead single "Linda Eh", written by Elvis Crespo, which topped the Tropical Airplay chart where it spent four weeks on this position. The track won a BMI Latin Award in 1998. Two other singles from the album, "A Que Te Pego Mi Mania" and "Deja Que la Gente Diga" became a top-ten hit on the Tropical Airplay chart. This would be the final album before Crespo left the group to launch his own solo career.

Track listing

Charts

Weekly charts

Year-end charts

References

1996 albums
Grupo Mania albums
Spanish-language albums
Sony Discos albums